The Soufrière River (French la Soufrière) is a river in the Soufrière Quarter on the island country of Saint Lucia. The French term "Soufrière" is a generic one referring to "Sulphury" volcanic peaks called La Soufrière or Soufrière Hills on each of St. Vincent, St. Lucia, Dominica, Guadeloupe.

Coarse
The Soufrière River empties into Soufrière Bay on the Caribbean Sea.  A river separates the town of Soufrière from the Fond Beniere area. A section of the river above the town was canalised and realigned in 1972; the river was realigned again in 1994.

Tributaries of the Soufrière River in the interior include the Jeremy and Migny rivers.

See also
List of rivers of Saint Lucia

References

Rivers of Saint Lucia